"Battle Symphony" is a promotional single by American rock band Linkin Park. The song was recorded by the band for their seventh studio album, titled One More Light. The song appears on the album as the fourth track. The song was written by Linkin Park members Brad Delson and Mike Shinoda. The song was released on March 16, 2017, but it was leaked some days before.

Background
The title "Battle Symphony" was first seen in a picture posted on Joe Hahn's Instagram story on September 6, 2016 of Brad playing acoustic guitar with the band's song board behind him, he also copyrighted. The band premiered the lyrics on Genius.com.

Music video
On January 12, Melissa Fox, a photographer from Moscow, Russia who was temporarily working in Los Angeles, ran into Linkin Park and confirmed that they were shooting a music video at the 4th Street Bridge. BMX rider Alfredo Mancuso also ran into the band that same day and lent his drone to the band so they could shoot some footage with it.

The "Battle Symphony" lyric video was released on March 16, 2017  and received 4.8 million views during its first week on YouTube. As of 31 December 2021, the lyric video has gained  over 87 million views.

Usage in media
This song is used in the video game by Konami, Pro Evolution Soccer 2018. This is the second time a song from Linkin Park had featured since All for Nothing with Page Hamilton.

This song is used in the 2017 NBA Playoffs.

Personnel
Linkin Park
 Chester Bennington – lead vocals
 Rob Bourdon – drums, percussion
 Brad Delson – guitars
 Dave "Phoenix" Farrell – bass guitar, backing vocals
 Joe Hahn ("Mr. Hahn") – programming, samplers
 Mike Shinoda – keyboards, backing vocals

Production personnel
 Produced by Mike Shinoda and Brad Delson
 Written by  Mike Shinoda, Brad Delson and Jon Green
 Vocals by Chester Bennington, Mike Shinoda and Dave Farrell
 Vocal production by Andrew Bolooki
 Engineered by Mike Shinoda, Ethan Mates and Josh Newell
 Mixed by Manny Marroquin
 Mixing engineered by Chris Galland
 Mixing assisted by Robin Florent and Jeff Jackson
 Mastered by Chris Gehringer

Notes
 Credits from streaming website.

Charts

References

Linkin Park songs
2017 songs
Songs written by Mike Shinoda
Songs written by Brad Delson
Warner Records singles
American pop rock songs
Electropop songs